The East End Historic District in Valdosta, Georgia is a  historic district which was listed on the National Register of Historic Places in 2005.  The district is northeast of downtown Valdosta and is roughly bounded by North Ashley and E. Ann Sts., East Hill Ave., and the Georgia and Florida Railroad tracks.  The district included 470 contributing buildings, a contributing structure, and a contributing site.

It includes Smith Park.

It includes work by local architect Lloyd Greer and it includes Queen Anne and Colonial Revival architecture.

References

External links

Historic districts on the National Register of Historic Places in Georgia (U.S. state)
Queen Anne architecture in Georgia (U.S. state)
Colonial Revival architecture in Georgia (U.S. state)
National Register of Historic Places in Lowndes County, Georgia